The Daesan Literary Awards are one of the most prestigious literary awards in South Korea. Prizes are awarded annually to selected works of poetry, fiction, drama, literary criticism, and translation. As of 2016, each prize includes a monetary award of 50 million won. The award-winning works are often subsequently translated from Korean to other languages and published overseas.

Winners

References 

South Korean literary awards
Fiction awards
Awards established in 1993